Loomis Branch is a stream in Washington County in the U.S. state of Missouri. It is a tributary of Courtois Creek.

The identity of namesake "Loomis"  is unknown.

See also
List of rivers of Missouri

References

Rivers of Washington County, Missouri
Rivers of Missouri